Euthalia eriphylae  is a butterfly of the family Nymphalidae (Limenitidinae). It is found in the Indomalayan realm.<ref>[http://ftp.funet.fi/pub/sci/bio/life/insecta/lepidoptera/ditrysia/papilionoidea/nymphalidae/limenitidinae/euthalia/ " Euthalia  " Hübner, [1819"] at Markku Savela's Lepidoptera and Some Other Life Forms</ref>

SubspeciesE. e. eriphylae Burma (Tenasserim)E. e. delmana Swinhoe, 1893 Assam,.BurmaE. e. chula Fruhstorfer, 1905 Thailand, MalayaE. e. lioneli Fruhstorfer, 1905 Indo-ChinaE. e. raya'' Eliot, 1960 Langkawi Island

References

Butterflies described in 1891
eriphylae